Intezaar may refer to:
 Intezaar (TV series), a 2016 Pakistani Urdu-language family drama series
 Intezaar (2022 film), a Pakistani drama film
 Intezaar (1956 film), a Pakistani musical romance film